Coetzala in Veracruz, Mexico. It is located in the montane central zone of the State of Veracruz, about 90 km from state capital Xalapa. It has a surface of 26.32 km2.

The municipality of  Coetzala  is delimited by Amatlán de los Reyes, Córdoba, Cuichapa, San Andrés Tenejapan,  Zongolica, Tequila and Naranjal.

It produces principally maize.

In  Coetzala , in July takes place the celebration in honor to Santa María Magdalena, Patron of the town.

The weather in  Coetzala  is cold all year with rains in summer and autumn.

References

External links 

  Municipal Official webpage
  Municipal Official Information

Municipalities of Veracruz